The 1947 North American Soccer Football League season featured a 30-match schedule from 6 April to 30 August, with all six teams scheduled to play 10 matches each. The champion Detroit Wolverines had dropped out of the league, while both the Detroit Pioneers and St. Louis Raiders were added to the league. The Pittsburgh Indians and Toronto Greenbacks finished tied for first place with 14 points each, thus requiring a two-match playoff to decide a champion. The two matches were played in October (after the Fall Season had started), with Pittsburgh winning both matches to claim the championship.

League standings

FINAL:  Pittsburgh defeated Toronto 3-2, 3-2.

References

See also
1946 North American Soccer Football League season

North American Soccer Football League seasons
North American Soccer Football League, 1947